Pride Tafirenyika (born 21 January 1984) is a retired Zimbabwean football midfielder.

References

1984 births
Living people
Zimbabwean footballers
Shooting Stars F.C. (Zimbabwe) players
CAPS United players
ZPC Kariba F.C. players
Chicken Inn F.C. players
Zimbabwe international footballers
Association football midfielders
Zimbabwe Premier Soccer League players